Ayat Al-Rifai, a young Syrian woman, was killed by her husband on 31 December 2021 in the Al Moujtahed neighbourhood of Damascus. The official Syrian media said that she died as a result of being subjected to violence by her husband and his family.

References

2021 murders in Syria
Murder in Damascus